The Orto Botanico Città Studi prima  orto botanico di Cascina Rosa (about 22,000 m2) is a botanical garden maintained by the University of Milan, and located at the end of Via Camillo Golgi 18, Milan, Italy. It is open daily.

The garden was established on disused farmland in 2002 for research and education. Its primary research facilities are three greenhouses that include a total of 10 separate compartments that support modern technology including cryopreservation, molecular testing, etc. Current research includes genetic improvement of rice, and exploration of useful genes in Arabidopsis thaliana. The garden's grounds contain many labeled plants, lawns, a lake, and about 1 km of walking paths.

See also 
 List of botanical gardens in Italy

References 
 Orto Botanico di Cascina Rosa
 Rete degli Orti Botanici della Lombardia (Italian, photographs)
 Parchi di Lombardia entry (Italian)
 Milano Scienze article (Italian)
 TRE article (Italian)

Botanical gardens in Italy
Gardens in Milan
University of Milan
Tourist attractions in Milan